Countryman is a surname. Notable people with the surname include:

Dana Countryman (born 1954), American electronic musician
Dayton Countryman (1918–2011), American politician
Edward Countryman, American historian
Gratia Countryman (1866–1953), American librarian
Robbie Countryman, American television director
Thomas M. Countryman (born 1957), American diplomat